The 31st Paratrooper Regiment is a 1,800 men strong formation of the German Army with its headquarters in Seedorf in north Germany. The regiment was formed in fall 2014 by restructuring the 31st Airborne Brigade. Initially under direct command of the Rapid Forces Division it joined the newly raised 1st Airborne Brigade on 1 April 2015.

Structure 
 31st Paratrooper Regiment
 1st Staff and Support Company
 2nd EGB Forces Company
 3rd EGB Forces Company
 4th Paratrooper Company
 5th Paratrooper Company
 6th Paratrooper Company
 7th Fire Support Company (with Wiesel Armored Weapons Carriers and 120mm mortars)
 8th Airborne Logistic Company
 9th Airborne Medical Company
 10th Recruits Training Company
 12th Paratrooper Company (Reserve)

References

External links 
 Website of the Regiment

Infantry regiments of Germany
Airborne units and formations of Germany
Military units and formations established in 2014